Glucosamine-6-phosphate isomerase 1 is an enzyme that in humans is encoded by the GNPDA1 gene.

References

Further reading

External links